The 20th Special Forces Group (Airborne) (20th SFG) (A) is one of two Army National Guard groups for the United States Army Special Forces.  20th Group—as it is sometimes called—is designed to deploy and execute nine doctrinal missions: unconventional warfare, foreign internal defense, direct action, counter-insurgency, special reconnaissance, counter-terrorism, information operations, counterproliferation of weapon of mass destruction, and security force assistance.

It is headquartered in Birmingham, Alabama (and is thus part of the Alabama Army National Guard) and as part of the United States Southern Command has an area of responsibility covering 32 countries, including Latin America south of Mexico, the Caribbean, the Gulf of Mexico, and the southwestern Atlantic Ocean. The area is shared with the Eglin Air Force Base-based 7th Special Forces Group, which is the active Regular Army Special Forces group responsible for the same region.

Following the start of the Global War on Terror the 20th has been actively deployed to Iraq, Afghanistan and other places around the world.

History

Gulf War 
The first large scale activation of the 20th Special Forces Group took place during the first Gulf War. The unit was mobilized and based at Fort Bragg, North Carolina for training. The 7th Special Forces Group supported and validated the training. The war ended quickly and the 20th Group was soon deactivated. Some individual members did participate in the conflict as augmentees to other Special Forces groups or organizations.

Operation Provide Comfort 
As many as 50 individuals served as augmentees to the 10th Special Forces Group and deployed to Turkey and northern Iraq during Operation Provide Comfort.

Operation Uphold Democracy 
The 20th Special Forces Group provided several rotations of companies to the operation in Haiti during 1995 during Operation Uphold Democracy.

Operation Enduring Freedom (OEF) 
The 3rd Battalion, 20th Special Forces Group deployed a significant number of its battalion headquarters to augment the Combined Joint Special Operations Task Force - Afghanistan (CJSOTF-A). At the time the CJSOTF-A was led and manned by the 3rd Special Forces Group. The 3rd Battalion also provided companies to the fight in the early states of OEF.

The 20th Special Forces Group headquarters and support staff was activated in the spring of 2002, trained up at Fort McClellan, Alabama, and then deployed to Afghanistan to lead and man the CJSOTF-A. It was augmented by several officers and NCOs of 7th Special Forces Group. In addition, the 1st Battalion deployed to Karshi-Khanabad Air Base, "K2," in Uzbekistan and basing AOBs and teams throughout northern and eastern Afghanistan. At the same time a battalion of the 19th Special Forces Group was based at Kabul Military Training Center just north of Kabul to train up the initial battalions of the Afghan National Army. The 2nd Battalion, 7th Group was based at Kandahar. 2nd Battalion 20th Special Forces Group would replace 1st Battalion at K2 in 2003. At this point, the entire unit had deployed to Afghanistan.

The 20th Special Forces Group would continue to deploy its companies and battalions to Afghanistan for almost two decades. In addition, numerous individuals would serve as augmentees to several different organizations in Afghanistan over the years. The 20th Special Forces Group headquarters and support company was activated in 2011 and deployed to Afghanistan to augment the CJSOTF-A, and CFSOCC-A.

Operations Iraqi Freedom (OIF) 
Several individual augmentees from the 20th Special Forces Group served with various units in Iraq in the early stages (2003-2004) of the conflict - to include the CJSOTF-AP. Eventually almost all of the 20th Special Forces Group battalions and companies would rotate at least one time through Iraq from 2006 to 2011.

Operation Inherent Resolve (OIR) 
Several companies and numerous individual augmentees would deploy in support of OIR to Iraq.

Combined Joint Task Force – Horn of Africa 
For several years the 20th Special Forces Group manned the Special Operations Command and Control Element (SOCCE) Horn of Africa (HOA) located at Camp Lemonier, Djibouti.

Subordinate units

The 20th Special Forces Group is headquartered in Birmingham, Alabama, with companies and battalions in the following locations:

 20th Special Forces Group Headquarters (Birmingham, Alabama)
 Group Support Battalion (Gadsden, Alabama)
 Military Intelligence Company (Louisville, Kentucky)
 1st Battalion HHC (Fort Payne, Alabama)
 Company A (Auburn, Alabama)
 Company B (Albemarle, North Carolina)
 Company C (Chicopee, Massachusetts)
 2nd Battalion HHC (Jackson, Mississippi)
 Company A (Camp Atterbury, Indiana)
 Company B (Glen Arm, Maryland)
 Company C (Camp McCain, Mississippi)
 3rd Battalion HHC (Camp Blanding, Starke, Florida)
 Company A (Ocala, Florida)
 Company B (Roanoke Rapids, North Carolina)
 Company C (Wauchula, Florida)

Notable current and former unit members 

 Tim Kennedy, retired mixed martial artist who has fought in the UFC, Strikeforce, the WEC
 Scott L. Thoele, retired U.S. Army general officer

Gallery

References

External links

20th Special Forces Group facebook page – updated weekly
20th Special Forces Group (Airborne) Homepage
20th Special Forces Group from GlobalSecurity.org  Archived
Beret Flash (Archived)

Special Forces 020
Groups of the United States Army National Guard
Military units and formations established in 1961